Cilla All Mixed Up is Cilla Black's sixteenth and final solo album, released worldwide on 7 September 2009 by EMI to digital download. The album was conceived to celebrate Black's 45th year in the music business. An array of original hit singles and album tracks held at Abbey Road studios were given a club makeover alongside a few more recent songs taken from Black's last studio album Beginnings (2003). The project features contributions from production team Almighty as well as other club DJs from the UK, Middle East and Asia. The lead single for the album project was the Almighty mix of "Something Tells Me".

Track listing
 "Step Inside Love [Almighty Radio Edit]" (John Lennon, Paul McCartney) – 3:43
 "Something Tells Me [Almighty Mix]" (Roger Greenaway, Roger Cook) – 7:28
 "Anyone Who Had a Heart [Almighty Mix]" (Burt Bacharach, Hal David) – 6:21
 "Baby We Can’t Go Wrong [Almighty Radio Edit]" (Jimmy Dunning) – 3:38
 "I Don't Know How to Love Him [David Lee Marks Radio Edit]" (Andrew Lloyd Webber, Tim Rice) – 4:11
 "Beautiful Goodbye [Klubkidz Extended Mix]" (Jennifer Hanson, Kim Patton Johnston) – 5:42
 "Faded Images [Tommy Sandhu's Ram Mix]" (Kenny Lynch, Tony Hicks) – 3:56
 "Kiss You All Over [Tommy Sandhu's Big Bill Mix]" (Mike Chapman, Nicky Chinn) – 5:01
 "A Fool Am I (Dimmelo Parlami) [Marley M Remix]" (Flavio Carraresi, Alberto Testa, Peter Callander) – 7:08
 "Your Song [Pookadelic Remix]" (Elton John, Bernie Taupin) – 6:53
 "Step Inside Love [DJ Ronstar - Step In Da Club Mix]" (Lennon, McCartney) – 5:18
 "Something Tells Me [Dan Thomas Club Mix]" (Greenaway, Cook) – 6:41

Bonus tracks on the 2018 double CD Cilla All Mixed Up (2009) / Beginnings: Revisited (2009): 
13. "Black Paper Roses [Chicken Feed Remix]" (Belle Gonzalez) – 2:57 
14. "Imagine [Matt Pop Club Mix]" (John Lennon) – 4:21

Credits
Personnel
 Lead vocals by Cilla Black
 Produced by Stephen Munns
 Executive producer: Robert Willis

References

External links
 CillaBlack.com Discography – Cilla All Mixed Up (2009) / Beginnings: Revisited (2009) (2CD released in 2018) 
 EMI Music Official Site
 Cilla Black - All Mixed Up (2009) / Beginnings: Revisited (2009) (2CD released in 2018) at AllMusic
 Cilla Black - Cilla All Mixed Up (2009) / Beginnings: Revisited (2009) (2CD released in 2018) album releases & credits at Discogs
 Cilla Black - Cilla All Mixed Up (2009) album to be listened as stream on Spotify

Further reading
 

2009 remix albums
Cilla Black albums
EMI Records remix albums